Penelope Dora Harvey Boothby (2 August 1881 – 22 February 1970) was an English female tennis player. She was born in Finchley, Middlesex. She is best remembered for her ladies' singles title at the 1909 Wimbledon Championships.

Biography
Boothby was born in Finchley, and with her older sister Gertrude, lived there with her step-parents Harry and Gertrude Penn. Harry was a civil engineer, and by 1901, they had moved to South Norwood, where she played at Beulah Hill Club, and during the winter months, she played badminton.

In 1908, she won a silver medal in the women's singles event at the 1908 Summer Olympics.

In 1909, when she won the Ladies' Singles at Wimbledon, the runner-up of the Men's Singles, Josiah Ritchie, was also living in Norwood. Also in 1909, she won the singles title of the British Covered Court Championships, played on wood courts at the Queen's Club in London, after defeating Madeline O’Neill in the final in straight sets.

In 1911, she became the first female player to lose a Wimbledon final without winning a game, losing to Dorothea Douglass Lambert Chambers 6–0, 6–0.

In 1914, she married Arthur C.Geen.

She died in Hammersmith or Hampstead, London in 1970.

Grand Slam finals

Singles (1 titles, 2 runners-up)

1This was actually the all-comers final as Charlotte Cooper Sterry did not defend her 1908 Wimbledon title, which resulted in the winner of the all-comers final winning the challenge round and thus Wimbledon in 1909 by walkover.

Doubles (1 title)

References

External links

 John Arlott (Hrsg.): The Oxford companion to sports & games. Oxford University Press, London 1975
 
 All England champions 1899–2007

1881 births
1970 deaths
English female tennis players
English female badminton players
Olympic silver medallists for Great Britain
Olympic tennis players of Great Britain
People from Finchley
Tennis players at the 1908 Summer Olympics
Wimbledon champions (pre-Open Era)
Olympic medalists in tennis
Grand Slam (tennis) champions in women's singles
Grand Slam (tennis) champions in women's doubles
Medalists at the 1908 Summer Olympics
Tennis people from Greater London
British female tennis players